Black Ermine (Spanish:Armiño negro) is a 1953  Argentine romantic film directed by Carlos Hugo Christensen and starring Laura Hidalgo and Roberto Escalada.

The film's sets were designed by the art director Gori Muñoz. It was made by Argentina Sono Film, the country's largest production company. The film is set in Peru, and location filming took place there.

Synopsis
In the Peruvian capital of Lima, an attractive woman maintains a luxurious lifestyle by taking a series of wealthy lovers. When her son returns from school she takes him on a holiday to Cuzco to see the site of Machu Picchu. While there she meets and falls in love with an Argentine painter, who her son admires greatly. On returning to Lima, she distances herself from her former lovers including a bullfighter who is infatuated by her. But, heavily in debt, she decides to spend a final night with one of her suitors in order to pay off her bills, but with tragic consequences for her relationship with her son.

Cast
Enrique Abeledo
Roberto Escalada
Gloria Ferrandiz
Aurelia Ferrer
Nicolás Fregues
Ricardo Galache
Laura Hidalgo
Federico Mansilla
Bernardo Perrone
Néstor Zavarce

External links
 

1953 films
1950s Spanish-language films
1953 romantic drama films
Films directed by Carlos Hugo Christensen
Films set in Peru
Films shot in Peru
Argentine romantic drama films
Argentine black-and-white films
1950s Argentine films